Voyages is a 1999 French drama film directed by Emmanuel Finkiel. The film was screened at the Directors' Fortnight event of the 1999 Cannes Film Festival and won the Award of the Youth for French Film.

Cast 
 Shulamit Adar - Rivka
 Liliane Rovère - Regine
  - Vera
  - Graneck
 Mosko Alkalai - Shimon 
 Maurice Chevit - Mendelbaum

References

External links 

1999 drama films
1999 films
French drama films
Films directed by Emmanuel Finkiel
1990s French films